Khao Kho is a district (amphoe) of Phetchabun province, northern Thailand.

Etymology
The name of the district comes from Khao Kho, a peak in the Phetchabun Mountains, named either after Livistona speciosa, a kind of palm tree, or after the Ceylon oak. Both species are known as kho in Thai and are abundant in the area.

History
Khao Kho was established as a minor district (king amphoe) on 21 August 1984 by splitting the two tambons Thung Samo and Khaem Son from Lom Sak district. It was upgraded to a full district on 19 July 1991.

Between 1965 and 1984, this mountainous area was a battleground in the fight between the Thai communist party and the Royal Thai Army.

Geography
Neighbouring districts are (from the east clockwise) Lom Kao, Lom Sak and Mueang Phetchabun of Phetchabun Province, Noen Maprang, Wang Thong and Nakhon Thai of Phitsanulok province, and Dan Sai of Loei province.

The Phetchabun Mountains are a mountain chain in Khao Kho.

Administration 
The district is divided into seven sub-districts (tambons), which are further subdivided into 72 villages (mubans). There are no municipal areas (thesabans) in the district. There are five tambon administrative organizations (TAO).

Population
At present, Khek Noi Sub-district is home to the largest Hmong community in Thailand.

References

External links
amphoe.com

Khao Kho